Maurice Lloyd (February 15, 1983) is a former professional Canadian football linebacker who played for the Saskatchewan Roughriders and Edmonton Eskimos of the Canadian Football League. After spending three seasons with the Roughriders, he signed with the Eskimos and spent two seasons with that team. He sat out the 2011 season before re-signing with Saskatchewan. He played college football at UConn.

College career
Lloyd attended the University of Connecticut under coach Randy Edsall.  He started at the middle linebacker for the Huskies all four seasons, from 2001 to 2004 and was able to record 18 solo tackles his Sophomore year.  His junior year, he led his team in tackles with 122 and he finished his senior year with 117 tackles, 12 tackles for losses, three quarterback sacks, and an interception.

Professional career

Saskatchewan Roughriders
In May 2006, Lloyd was picked up as a free agent by the Saskatchewan Roughriders. He started in six regular season games and both playoff games at middle linebacker, making his CFL debut in week 13.

In 2007, Lloyd started 16 regular season games, both playoff games, and the 95th Grey Cup game, missing two regular season games due to injury.  Lloyd finished the regular season with 69 defensive tackles, four special teams tackles, three quarterback sacks and two interceptions.  He was named a West Division All Star for the year.

On September 4, 2008 Lloyd was named the CFL's defensive player of the month and later became a 2008 CFL All-Star.

Edmonton Eskimos
Lloyd signed with the Edmonton Eskimos on February 16, 2009. After two seasons with the Eskimos, Lloyd was released on March 14, 2011. He was not picked up by a CFL team during the 2011 season.

Saskatchewan Roughriders
Lloyd re-signed with the Roughriders on December 6, 2011 after the team released incumbent starting middle linebacker Barrin Simpson. He was released before training camp on May 11, 2012.

Personal life
Lloyd spends his off-season as a high school behavioral specialist in Connecticut.  He likes to spend time with his three children and wife. He also has a passion for flipping houses and investing in real estate. He now is actively pursuing his real estate investing goals by buying and rehabbing houses in Connecticut as part of the We Buy Houses team

References

External links

 MoLloyd.com Official Website
 University of Connecticut Athletic page

1983 births
Living people
American players of Canadian football
Edmonton Elks players
UConn Huskies football players
Sportspeople from Daytona Beach, Florida
Saskatchewan Roughriders players
Mainland High School alumni